The 1920 South Carolina Gamecocks football team represented the University of South Carolina during the 1920 Southern Intercollegiate Athletic Association football season. Led by first-year head coach Sol Metzger, the Gamecocks compiled an overall record of 5–4 with a mark of 3–1 in SIAA play.

Schedule

References

South Carolina
South Carolina Gamecocks football seasons
South Carolina Gamecocks football